{{DISPLAYTITLE:Cav1.4}}

Cav1.4 also known as the calcium channel, voltage-dependent, L type, alpha 1F subunit (CACNA1F), is a human gene.

This gene encodes a member of the alpha-1 subunit family; a protein in the voltage-dependent calcium channel complex. Calcium channels mediate the influx of calcium ions into the cell upon membrane polarization and consist of a complex of alpha-1, alpha-2/delta, beta, and gamma subunits in a 1:1:1:1 ratio. The alpha-1 subunit has 24 transmembrane segments and forms the pore through which ions pass into the cell. There are multiple isoforms of each of the proteins in the complex, either encoded by different genes or the result of alternative splicing of transcripts. Alternate transcriptional splice variants of the gene described here have been observed but have not been thoroughly characterized. Mutations in this gene have been shown to cause incomplete X-linked congenital stationary night blindness type 2 (CSNB2).

See also
 Calcium channel

References

Further reading

External links
  GeneReviews/NCBI/NIH/UW entry on X-Linked Congenital Stationary Night Blindness
 

Ion channels